This is a list of companies listed on the Malta Stock Exchange.

References 

Malta stock exchange

Malta